The March 782 was an open-wheel Formula 2 car, designed, developed and built by British manufacturer March Engineering in 1978. The 782 chassis was very competitive, and March dominated the season with their 782 chassis, and it was a clean-sweep; winning 11 out of the 12 races, and Bruno Giacomelli winning the championship, with 78 points (dropped from 82 points). Marc Surer finished second-place in the championship as runner-up, with 48 points (dropped from 51 points); also driving a 782 chassis. It saw continued used through 1981, with Alberto Colombo winning at Hockenheim in 1980 with a two-year-old 782 chassis.

References

Formula Two cars
March vehicles